USS Merrimack, also improperly Merrimac, was a steam frigate, best known as the hull upon which the ironclad warship CSS Virginia was constructed during the American Civil War.  The CSS Virginia then took part in the Battle of Hampton Roads (also known as "the Battle of the Monitor and the Merrimack") in the first engagement between ironclad warships.

Merrimack was the first of six screw frigates (steam frigates powered by screw propellers) begun in 1854. Like others of her class (and ), she was named after a river.  The Merrimack originates in New Hampshire and flows through the town of Merrimac, Massachusetts, often considered an older spelling which has sometimes caused confusion of the name.

History

Creation 
Merrimack was launched by the Boston Navy Yard 15 June 1855, sponsored by Mary E. Simmons, and commissioned 20 February 1856, Captain Garrett J. Pendergrast in command. She was the second ship of the Navy to be named for the Merrimack River.

Service 
Shakedown cruises took the new screw frigate to the Caribbean and to Western Europe. Merrimack visited Southampton, Brest, Lisbon, and Toulon before returning to Boston and decommissioning 22 April 1857 for repairs. Recommissioning 1 September 1857, Merrimack got underway from Boston Harbor 17 October as flagship for the Pacific Squadron. She rounded Cape Horn and cruised the Pacific coast of South and Central America until heading for home 14 November 1859. Upon returning to Norfolk, she decommissioned 16 February 1860.

Merrimack was still in ordinary during the crisis preceding Lincoln's inauguration. Soon after becoming Secretary of the Navy, Gideon Welles took action to prepare the frigate for sea, planning to move her to Philadelphia. The day before the firing on Fort Sumter, Welles directed that "great vigilance be exercised in guarding and protecting" Norfolk Navy Yard and her ships. On the afternoon of 17 April 1861, the day Virginia seceded, Engineer in Chief B. F. Isherwood managed to get the frigate's engines lit off; but the previous night secessionists had sunk light boats in the channel between Craney Island and Sewell's Point, blocking Merrimack. On 20 April, before evacuating the Navy Yard, the U.S. Navy burned Merrimack to the waterline and sank her to preclude capture.  

The Confederacy, in desperate need of ships, raised Merrimack and rebuilt her as an ironclad ram, according to a design prepared by Lt. John Mercer Brooke, CSN. Commissioned as CSS Virginia 17 February 1862, the ironclad was the hope of the Confederacy to destroy the wooden ships in Hampton Roads, and to end the Union blockade which had already seriously impeded the Confederate war effort.

See also

List of steam frigates of the United States Navy
Union Navy
Ships captured in the American Civil War
Bibliography of American Civil War naval history

Footnotes

References

Bibliography

 
 
 

 Nelson, James L. 2004. The Reign of Iron: The Story of the First Battling Ironclads, the Monitor and the Merrimack. HarperCollins Publishers, NY. .

External links  
history.navy.mil/photos: USS Merrimack
Journal of a Cruise onboard U.S. Steam Frigate Merrimack, 1856–1858, MS 15 held by Special Collections & Archives, Nimitz Library at the United States Naval Academy

Sailing frigates of the United States Navy
Battle of Hampton Roads
New Hampshire in the American Civil War
Ships of the Union Navy
Vessels captured from the United States Navy
Shipwrecks of the American Civil War
Shipwrecks of the Virginia coast
Ships built in Boston
1855 ships
Scuttled vessels
Maritime incidents in April 1861